Kalabhooshana Visharad Shirley Waijayantha Gunasinghe (Sinhala:ෂර්ලි වෛජයන්ත), is a Sri Lankan singer, musician, music instructor and music teacher by profession. One of the founding members of Bellwood College of Music in Sri Lanka, Waijayantha has produced several leading singers to the Sri Lankan classical music industry in a career spanning more than four decades.

Personal life 
He was born in Dalugama, Kelaniya, Sri Lanka. He was educated at Eeriyawetiya Maha Vidyalaya.

Career
During the school times, he did not focus on music. However, he became an active member in many literary activities including singing and won many prizes. Later he started to study music under Visharada P. V. Nandasiri for his Advance Level examination and finally completed his Sangeetha Visharada exam. After finishing visharada exam, Waijayantha made his first teaching appointment to Kelaniya Maha Vidyalaya. During this period, he was able to join with Sri Lanka Broadcasting Corporation (SLBC) and sang four songs for 'Sarala Gee' musical program.

However, with an intention to become a leading singer in the country, Waijayantha felt compelled to write his own songs and tunes. Then he launched his maiden cassette with the help of his friend Lionel Nawanage and his wife Sudharma Nawanage. In the album, he was lucky enough to sing two duets with renowned songstress Nanda Malini. Some of his popular solo hits include: Aatha Sithijayae, Dasata Huruwu, Kavada Da Ayae, Samawa Ithiriwa, Mang Bolanda Wiyae, Mata Epa Obe Hasarel, Mata Sihinayak Wage and Mal Mal Hina. He also worked as the Leader of Youth Service Band for many years.

In the early 1980s, he joined the National Youth Service Council and was able to produce many fresh talents in the country including: Chandralekha Perera, Somasiri Medagedara and Chandrasena Hettiarachchi. In 2007, Waijayantha served as the Institute chief of Bellwood Aesthetic Institute, Kandy, as well as its deputy director. On 4 November 2007, he held a musical show titled 'Waijayantha Gee' at the BMICH at 6 p.m after a lapse of 20 years. During the show, he launched the album titled "Ithin Kiyanna Aadare".

On 3 November 2021, he was bestowed with Kalabhooshana title at the 36th Kalabhooshana State Awards Ceremony.

References

External links
 Shirley Waijayantha discography

Sri Lankan Buddhists
20th-century Sri Lankan male singers
Living people
Sri Lankan composers
Sinhalese singers
Year of birth missing (living people)
21st-century Sri Lankan male singers